The Detroit Institute of Musical Arts (DIMA) was a music conservatory in Detroit, Michigan that was actively providing higher education in music from 1914-1970.

History
The Detroit Institute of Musical Arts was founded by several Michigan based musicians and teachers. It opened its doors in the Autumn of 1914. 

The school granted its own degrees up until 1945 when it began awarding diplomas through the University of Detroit (UD). The school resumed granting its own degrees in the late 1950s when its association with the UD ended. In 1957 the school relocated to new facilities at 200 E. Kirby at the corner of John R and Kirby. 

In 1970 the school merged with the Detroit Music Settlement School to form the Detroit Community Music School. That school in turn became a part of the College for Creative Studies (CCS) in 1984, but was later passed off by the CCS to Marygrove College in 2000.

Notable alumni
Kenneth Louis Cox II
James Jelasic
Ken Kersey
Betty Louise Lumby
Freda Payne
Dorothy Geneva Styles
Larry Teal
Dino Valle
Earl Williams
Yusef Lateef (did not graduate)

Notable faculty
Elio Gennari
Necia Desiree Harkless
William Howland

References

Educational institutions established in 1914
Educational institutions disestablished in 1970
Music schools in Michigan
University of Detroit Mercy
1914 establishments in Michigan